The Men's sprint cross-country skiing competition in the classical technique at the 2010 Winter Olympics in Vancouver, Canada was held on 17 February at Whistler Olympic Park in Whistler, British Columbia.

Sweden's Björn Lind was the defending Olympic champion in this event, though the event was in the freestyle technique. Norway's Ola Vigen Hattestad was the defending world champion in this event which was also held in freestyle technique. Emil Jönsson of Sweden won the test event that took place at Olympic venue on 16 January 2009. The last World Cup event prior to the 2010 Games in this format took place on 6 February 2010 in Canmore, Alberta and was won by Jönsson.

Lind was eliminated in the quarterfinals, Jönsson was eliminated in the semifinals, and Hattestad finished fourth. It is the first Olympic medals for all three finishers. The event ended in a photofinish between Russians Nikita Kryukov and Alexander Panzhinskiy with Kriukov edging out Panzhinsky who had led most of the race.

Results

Qualifying
Qualifying took place at 10:45 PST.

Quarterfinals
Quarterfinals took place at 12:55 PST.

Quarterfinal 2

Quarterfinal 3

Quarterfinal 4

Quarterfinal 5

Semifinals
Semifinals took place at 13:30 PST.
Semifinals 1

Semifinals 2

Finals
Finals took place at 13:55 PST.

See also
Cross-country skiing at the 2010 Winter Paralympics – Men's 1 km Sprint Classic

References

External links
2010 Winter Olympics results: Men's Individual Sprint Classic, from https://web.archive.org/web/20100222080013/http://www.vancouver2010.com/ retrieved 2010-02-16.

Men's cross-country skiing at the 2010 Winter Olympics
Men's individual sprint cross-country skiing at the Winter Olympics